Caladenia conferta, commonly known as the crowded spider orchid or coast spider-orchid, is a plant in the orchid family Orchidaceae and is endemic to a restricted area in South Australia. It is a ground orchid with a single hairy leaf, and usually a single yellowish-green flower with red markings on a wiry, hairy stalk.

Description
Caladenia conferta is a terrestrial, perennial, deciduous, herb with an underground tuber.

The lateral sepals and the petals spread widely. It is dark, yellowish-green with a dark maroon tip and the edges have irregular teeth. There are six crowded rows of calli along the centre of the labellum, decreasing in size towards the front. Flowering occurs from August to September.

Taxonomy and naming
Caladenia conferta was first formally described by David L. Jones in 1991 and the description was published in Australian Orchid Research. The type specimen was collected between Port Julia and Port Vincent. The specific epithet (conferta) is a Latin word meaning "crowded", referring to the crowded calli in the centre of the labellum.

Distribution and habitat
This caladenia grows in mallee woodland. It is found in the Eyre Peninsula, Yorke Peninsula and South-East botanical regions of South Australia.

Conservation
Coloured spider-orchid is classified as "Endangered" in South Australia and under the Australian Government Environment Protection and Biodiversity Conservation Act 1999 (EPBC Act). The main threats to the species are grazing by native and feral animals, competition from weed species and habitat loss due to land clearing.

References

conferta
Plants described in 1991
Endemic orchids of Australia
Orchids of South Australia
Taxa named by David L. Jones (botanist)